
Donington is a large village and civil parish in the South Holland district of Lincolnshire, England. The parish includes the hamlet of Northorpe, and falls within the drainage area of the Black Sluice Internal Drainage Board. Donington is the birthplace of the explorer Matthew Flinders.

History 
Donington was large enough in the C18th to attract the travelling theatrical companies. In 1784 Mathew Flinders, father of the famous navigator, wrote 'in the latter half of October and beginning of November we have a small Company of Comedians with us. I went 3 or 4 times and once or twice was tolerably entertained'.

Governance
As well as having its own parish council, Donington is part of the electoral ward of Donington, Quadring and Gosberton within the South Holland district of Lincolnshire. The total population of the ward taken at the 2011 census was 7,102.

It also forms part of the Donington Rural electoral division of Lincolnshire County Council.

Parish church
Donington's  Church of England parish church is dedicated to St Mary and the Holy Rood. It is a Grade I listed building. The church is almost a complete combination of early Decorated and late Perpendicular style. Its chancel, however, is mainly Early English.

Matthew Flinders' remains were identified in London in January 2019. Permission has been granted for him to be re-buried in the north aisle of the Church of St Mary and the Holy Rood where he was baptised.

Community

Local amenities include a park, a playpark, and a teen skatepark. Donington businesses include The Black Bull public house, Coop and Budgens stores in the Market Place, an independent opticians, a butchers, a hair stylist, a flower shop, and a pets & produce outlet. A timber windows manufacturer, employing approximately 100 people, is one of the main employers, while a fire prevention and security company has its head office in Donington.

There are two schools: the Donington Cowley Endowed Primary School, and Cowley Academy, a non-selective secondary school for pupils aged 11 to 16, and partly Grade II listed.

Donington is on an operating passenger rail line with stopping services, but has no station. In 2008 Hull Trains proposed reopening it as a railhead to nearby Boston for a direct Lincoln to London service.

Donington has football teams for two age groups: Old Doningtonians for over eighteens, and Young Dons (established in 1996) for anyone under that age; Old Dons play in the Saturday Boston League and Young Dons on a Sunday in the Mid-Lincolnshire Junior League.

References

External links

 "St Mary and the Holy Rood", Churches in England. Retrieved 21 July 2011
 "Donington", Genuki.org.uk. Retrieved 21 July 2011
 Thomas Cowley High School, Retrieved 7 July 2013

Villages in Lincolnshire
Civil parishes in Lincolnshire
South Holland, Lincolnshire